Araluen Botanical Park is located in a sheltered valley in the Darling Ranges approximately  south of Perth, Western Australia, in the suburb of Roleystone. There is a small entry fee to the park, and it is open every day of the year. There is a mixture of exotic plant varieties, however the park also contains many remnants of native bush.

History

Jack Simons bought the property in 1929 on behalf of the Young Australia League to use as a holiday camp.
The YAL put the Araluen Botanic Gardens up for sale in 1985 (but retained Camp Simons). A private investor was going to redevelop the land, however the local communities rallied the state government to purchase the Park. Encouraged by strong community support, the State government purchased the Park in 1990. The Araluen Botanic Park Foundation became incorporated in July 1990 with the aim of working with the Western Australian Planning Commission to restore the Park. Since 1995, the Foundation has managed the Park under lease from the Commission.

Facilities

Facilities include a gift shop, cafe with tearooms and function centre, parking, toilets, a miniature train and walkways.
The old swimming pool is now a lake and the diving board has been removed.

Events
Araluen hosts annual events, including the Tulip Festival in spring and the Fremantle Chilli Festival in summer at Fremantle Esplanade and the Fremantle Fishing Boat Harbour.
From 1997 till 2007 an annual folk music festival was also held each spring in Araluen.
Children's activity days are held during school holidays. Araluen recently sponsored the ANZMAC Mid-year Doctoral Colloquium Event.

References

External links
Araluen Botanic Park website

Botanical gardens in Western Australia
Gardens in Western Australia
1930 establishments in Australia
State Register of Heritage Places in the City of Armadale
Darling Range